Euphorbia meuleniana is a species of plant in the family Euphorbiaceae. It is endemic to Yemen.

References

meuleniana
Endemic flora of Yemen
Vulnerable flora of Asia
Taxonomy articles created by Polbot